Good Side, Bad Side may refer to:

Good Side, Bad Side (Crucial Conflict album), 1998
Good Side, Bad Side (Master P album), 2004